Alejandro González may refer to:

Sportspeople
 Alejandro González (basketball) (1907–1979), Uruguayan basketball player
 Alejandro González (Costa Rican footballer) (born 1955), Costa Rican footballer
 Alejandro González (cyclist) (born 1972), Argentine road racing cyclist
 Alejandro González (boxer) (born 1973), Mexican boxer
 Alejandro González (Chilean footballer) (born 1977), Chilean footballer
 Alejandro González Garrido (born 1987), Spanish rugby player for Valladolid RAC
 Alejandro González (Uruguayan footballer) (born 1988), Uruguayan footballer
 Alejandro González (tennis) (born 1989), Colombian tennis player
 Alejandro González Jr. (born 1993), Mexican boxer, son of also the Mexican boxer Alejandro Martín González
 Ale González (born 1994), Spanish footballer

Others
 Alejandro González Velázquez (1719–1772), Spanish late-Baroque architect and painter
 Alejandro González Alcocer (born 1951), former governor of the Mexican state of Baja California
 Alejandro González Yáñez (born 1956), Mexican politician
 Alejandro González Malavé (1958–1986), Puerto Rican undercover agent
 Alejandro González Iñárritu (born 1963), Mexican film director 
 Alejandro González (guitarist), Cuban guitarist, composer, arranger, and professor with notable work in the Dominican Republic

See also
 Alex Gonzalez (disambiguation)